This is a list of expressways and highways in Malaysia.

Toll expressways
List of the expressways which are under the administration of the federal Malaysian Highway Authority (MHA). The Malaysian expressways are controlled-access highways.

Non toll expressways

Federal roads
List of highways classified as federal roads which are under the administration of the federal Malaysian Public Works Department (JKR).

State roads
List of highways classified as state roads which are under the administration of the state Malaysian Public Works Department (JKR).

 See Spreadsheet of Toll Roads in Malaysia

Municipal roads
List of highways classified as municipal roads.

Other expressways/highways projects under development/planned
List of the expressway and highway projects under development or planned.

See also
 Malaysian Highway Authority
 Malaysian Expressway System
 Chronology of the Malaysian Expressway System
 Multi Lane Free Flow

References

Malaysian Expressway System
Malaysian Public Works Department
Expressways and highways

de:Liste der Autobahnen in Malaysia
fr:Liste des autoroutes de Malaisie#Liste des autoroutes
ms:Sistem Lebuh Raya Malaysia#Senarai lebuh raya